Cooper Robertson is an international architecture and urban design firm, headquartered in New York City, founded by Alex Cooper and Jaquelin T. Robertson.

History
Cooper Robertson was founded in 1979 by Alex Cooper under the name Alexander Cooper and Associates. Both Cooper and Robertson attended Yale College during the same period, later working together at the New York City Department of City Planning. The firm changed its name to Cooper, Robertson & Partners when Robertson joined in 1988. In 2015, they rebranded again and are now known as simply "Cooper Robertson".

The firm's work has included planned communities, urban infill, and transit-oriented developments, including Battery Park City in New York and the new communities of Celebration, Florida, Watercolor, Florida and Val d'Europe outside Paris, France. Watercolor, Florida and Val d'Europe outside Paris, France. Also known for architecture, open space design, and university campus planning, the firm's work includes a plan for the expansion of Harvard University's campus into Allston, Massachusetts, MOMA QNS, (the Museum of Modern Art's temporary home in Queens, New York), the New Albany Country Club in New Albany, Ohio outside Columbus, the new Columbia University School of Social Work building in Upper Manhattan, the Visitor Center at the Lewis Ginter Botanical Garden in Richmond, Virginia, the Framework for Campus Planning for Yale University, Zuccotti Park (a one block park adjacent to the World Trade Center site on Liberty Street in Lower Manhattan), and numerous houses, many of which are in the Hamptons on the East End of Long Island and in the Caribbean.

Awards and distinctions
The following is an incomplete list:
 The American Architecture Award for the Museum at the Gateway Arch, 2019
 DOCOMOMO Modernism in America, Civic Design Award of Excellence for the Museum at the Gateway Arch, 2019
 Society of American Registered Architects (SARA) National Design Award for The Edible Academy, 2018
 American Institute of Architects New York State Award of Excellence for the Master Plan of the Central Delaware, Philadelphia, Pennsylvania, 2013
 Alex Cooper & Jaquelin T. Robertson, Seaside Prize from the Seaside Institute, 2002
 Robertson on "the AD 100," Architectural Digest's list of the top 100 architects and interior designers whose work has been published by Architectural Digest.
 Jaquelin T. Robertson, Thomas Jefferson Medal in Architecture, 1998
 Jaquelin T. Robertson, Driehaus Prize for Classical Architecture, 2007
 Urban Land Institute Award for Excellence: Europe Competition for Val d'Europe, 2008
 Prix Rotthier pour la Reconstruction de La Ville for Val d'Europe, 2008
 American Institute of Architects (AIA) Honor Award in Regional and Urban Design for Zuccotti Park, 2008
 AIA Excellence in Design Award for MOMA QNS 2004
 National AIA Citation for Excellence in Urban Design for Battery Park City Master Plan 1991

Select Projects
Work by Cooper Robertson includes:

 The Art Museum at Princeton University (2024 Est.)
 The Museum at the Gateway Arch (2018)
 Miracle Mile & Giralda Avenue Streetscape in Coral Gables, Florida (2018) 
 The Edible Academy at New York Botanical Garden (2018)
 Drury University Master Plan (2017)
 Museum Park (Miami) Master Plan (2014)
 Harlem Village Academies High School (2013)
 University of Miami Master Plan (2012)
 Richard Rodgers Amphitheater in Marcus Garvey Park (2011)
 Ethical Culture Fieldston School (2007)
 Zuccotti Park (2006)
 Fordham University at Lincoln Center Campus Master Plan (2006)
 WindMark Beach, Florida for the St. Joe Company (2005)
 Hudson Yards Redevelopment Project (2005)
 Chula Vista Bayfront Master Plan (2004)
 Columbia University School of Social Work (2004)
 Watercolor, Florida for the St. Joe Company (2003)
 County of Charleston Judicial Center in Charleston, South Carolina (2003)
 The Inn At Perry Cabin (2002)
 The Institute for the Arts & Humanities at the University of North Carolina at Chapel Hill (2002)
 Val d'Europe (2002)
 Memphis Riverfront Master Plan (2001)
 MOMA QNS 2000
 Yale University Framework for Campus Planning (2000)
 Disneyland Resort Expansion Plan (2000)
 Max M. Fisher College of Business at the Ohio State University (1999)
 Boston Seaport Public Realm Plan (1999)
 Duke Clinic at Duke University Medical Center (1999)
 Lower Manhattan Streetscape Project (1998)
 Master Plan for Celebration, Florida for the Disney Development Company (1997)
 Golf Clubhouse at Celebration, Florida (1997)
 Trinity College Campus Master Plan (1997)
 E. Claiborne Robins Visitors Center and the Anne Holt Massey Greenhouses at the Lewis Ginter Botanical Garden (1997)
 Disney's Hilton Head Island Resort (1996)
 Sony Pictures Imageworks Headquarters Building (1996)
 Stapleton Airport Redevelopment Plan (1996)
 Calvin Klein Cosmetics Company Headquarters (1995)
 Genesis Apartments at Union Square (New York City) for HELP (the Housing Enterprise for the Less Privileged) (1994)
 Daniel Island Master Plan (1993)
 New Albany Country Club: Golf Clubhouse and Bath & Tennis Club (1993)
 Stuyvesant High School (1992)
 Henry Moore Sculpture Garden at the Nelson-Atkins Museum of Art (1988)
 Battery Park City Esplanade (1985)
 Battery Park City Master Plan (1980)
 International Trade Center Master Plan, Mount Olive Township, New Jersey (1979)

References

Further reading
 Cooper, Robertson & Partners: Cities to Gardens. The Images Publishing Group Pty Ltd, 2007

External links
 Cooper Robertson website

Architecture firms based in New York City
New Urbanism
New Classical architects
Urban planning
Companies based in New York City
Design companies established in 1979
1979 establishments in New York City